Bacterial growth is proliferation of bacterium into two daughter cells, in a process called binary fission. Providing no  event occurs, the resulting daughter cells are genetically identical to the original cell. Hence, bacterial growth occurs. Both daughter cells from the division do not necessarily survive.  However, if the surviving number exceeds unity on average, the bacterial population undergoes exponential growth. The measurement of an exponential bacterial growth curve in batch culture was traditionally a part of the training of all microbiologists; the basic means requires bacterial enumeration (cell counting) by direct and individual (microscopic, flow cytometry), direct and bulk (biomass), indirect and individual (colony counting), or indirect and bulk (most probable number, turbidity, nutrient uptake) methods.  Models reconcile theory with the measurements.

Phases

In autecological studies, the growth of bacteria (or other microorganisms, as protozoa, microalgae or yeasts) in batch culture can be modeled with four different phases: lag phase (A), log phase or exponential phase (B), stationary phase (C), and death phase (D).
 During lag phase, bacteria adapt themselves to growth conditions. It is the period where the individual bacteria are maturing and not yet able to divide. During the lag phase of the bacterial growth cycle, synthesis of RNA, enzymes and other molecules occurs.  During the lag phase cells change very little because the cells do not immediately reproduce in a new medium. This period of little to no cell division is called the lag phase and can last for 1 hour to several days. During this phase cells are not dormant.
 The log phase (sometimes called the logarithmic phase or the exponential phase) is a period characterized by cell doubling. The number of new bacteria appearing per unit time is proportional to the present population.  If growth is not limited, doubling will continue at a constant rate so both the number of cells and the rate of population increase doubles with each consecutive time period. For this type of exponential growth, plotting the natural logarithm of cell number against time produces a straight line. The slope of this line is the specific growth rate of the organism, which is a measure of the number of divisions per cell per unit time. The actual rate of this growth (i.e. the slope of the line in the figure) depends upon the growth conditions, which affect the frequency of cell division events and the probability of both daughter cells surviving. Under controlled conditions, cyanobacteria can double their population four times a day and then they can triple their population. Exponential growth cannot continue indefinitely, however, because the medium is soon depleted of nutrients and enriched with wastes.
 The stationary phase is often due to a growth-limiting factor such as the depletion of an essential nutrient, and/or the formation of an inhibitory product such as an organic acid. Stationary phase results from a situation in which growth rate and death rate are equal. The number of new cells created is limited by the growth factor and as a result the rate of cell growth matches the rate of cell death. The result is a “smooth,” horizontal linear part of the curve during the stationary phase. Mutations can occur during stationary phase. Bridges et al. (2001) presented evidence that DNA damage is responsible for many of the mutations arising in the genomes of stationary phase or starving bacteria.  Endogenously generated reactive oxygen species appear to be a major source of such damages.
At death phase (decline phase), bacteria die. This could be caused by lack of nutrients, environmental temperature above or below the tolerance band for the species, or other injurious conditions.
This basic batch culture growth model draws out and emphasizes aspects of bacterial growth which may differ from the growth of macrofauna.  It emphasizes clonality, asexual binary division, the short development time relative to replication itself, the seemingly low death rate, the need to move from a dormant state to a reproductive state or to condition the media, and finally, the tendency of lab adapted strains to exhaust their nutrients. In reality, even in batch culture, the four phases are not well defined. The cells do not reproduce in synchrony without explicit and continual prompting (as in experiments with stalked bacteria ) and their exponential phase growth is often not ever a constant rate, but instead a slowly decaying rate, a constant stochastic response to pressures both  to reproduce and to go dormant in the face of declining nutrient concentrations and increasing waste concentrations.

The decrease in number of bacteria may even become logarithmic. Hence, this phase of growth may also be called as negative logarithmic or negative exponential growth phase.

Near the end of the logarithmic phase of a batch culture, competence for natural genetic transformation may be induced, as in Bacillus subtilis and in other bacteria.  Natural genetic transformation is a form of DNA transfer that appears to be an adaptation for repairing DNA damages.

Batch culture is the most common laboratory growth method in which bacterial growth is studied, but it is only one of many.  It is ideally spatially unstructured and temporally structured.  The bacterial culture is incubated in a closed vessel with a single batch of medium.  In some experimental regimes, some of the bacterial culture is periodically removed and added to fresh sterile medium.  In the extreme case, this leads to the continual renewal of the nutrients.  This is a chemostat, also known as continuous culture.  It is ideally spatially unstructured and temporally unstructured, in a steady state defined by the rates of nutrient supply and bacterial growth. In comparison to batch culture, bacteria are maintained in exponential growth phase, and the growth rate of the bacteria is known.  Related devices include turbidostats and auxostats.  When Escherichia coli is growing very slowly with a doubling time of 16 hours in a chemostat most cells have a single chromosome.

Bacterial growth can be suppressed with bacteriostats, without necessarily killing the bacteria. Certain toxins can be used to suppress bacterial growth or kill bacteria. Antibiotics (or, more properly, antibacterial drugs) are drugs used to kill bacteria; they can have side effects or even cause adverse reactions in people, however they are not classified as toxins. In a synecological, true-to-nature situation in which more than one bacterial species is present, the growth of microbes is more dynamic and continual.

Liquid is not the only laboratory environment for bacterial growth.  Spatially structured environments such as biofilms or agar surfaces present additional complex growth models.

The 5th phase: Long-term stationary phase 
Long-term stationary phase, unlike early stationary phase (in which there is little cell division), is a highly dynamic period in which the birth and death rates are balanced. It’s been proven that after death phase E. coli can be maintained in batch culture for long periods without adding nutrients. By providing sterile distilled water to maintain volume and osmolarity, aerobically grown cultures can be maintained at densities of ~106 CFU per ml for more than 5 years without the addition of nutrients in batch culture.

Environmental conditions

Environmental factors influence rate of bacterial growth such as acidity (pH), temperature, water activity, macro and micro nutrients, oxygen levels, and toxins. Conditions tend to be relatively consistent between bacteria with the exception of extremophiles. Bacterium have optimal growth conditions under which they thrive, but once outside of those conditions the stress can result in either reduced or stalled growth, dormancy (such as formation spores), or death. Maintaining sub-optimal growth conditions is a key principle to food preservation.

Temperature
Low temperatures tend to reduce growth rates which has led to refrigeration being instrumental in food preservation. Depending on temperature, bacteria can be classified as:

 Psychrophiles
Psychrophiles are extremophilic cold-loving bacteria or archaea with an optimal temperature for growth at about 15 °C or lower (maximal temperature for growth at 20 °C, minimal temperature for growth at 0 °C or lower). Psychrophiles are typically found in Earth's extremely cold ecosystems, such as polar ice-cap regions, permafrost, polar surface, and deep oceans.
 Mesophiles
Mesophiles are bacteria that thrive at moderate temperatures, growing best between 20° and 45 °C. These temperatures align with the natural body temperatures of humans, which is why many human pathogens are mesophiles.
 Thermophiles
Survive under temperatures of 45–80 °C.

Acidity
Optimal acidity for bacteria tends to be around pH 6.5 to 7.0 with the exception of acidophiles. Some bacteria can change the pH such as by excreting acid resulting in sub-optimal conditions.

Water activity

Oxygen
Bacteria can be aerobes or anaerobes. Depending on the degree of oxygen required bacteria can fall into the following classes:

 facultative-anaerobes-ie aerotolerant absence or minimal oxygen required for their growth
 obligate-anaerobes grow only in complete absence of oxygen
 facultative aerobes-can grow either in presence or minimal oxygen
 obligate aerobes-grow only in the presence of oxygen

Micronutrients
Ample nutrients

Toxic compounds
Toxic compounds such as ethanol can hinder growth or kill bacteria. This is used beneficially for disinfection and in food preservation.

See also
 Monod equation
 Michaelis–Menten kinetics
Cell proliferation

References

External links

An examination of the exponential growth of bacterial populations
Science aid: Bacterial Growth High school (GCSE, Alevel) resource.
Microbial Growth, BioMineWiki
From the Wolfram Demonstrations Project — requires CDF player (free):
The Final Number of Bacterial Cells
Simulating Microbial Count Records with an Expanded Fermi Solution Model
Incipient Growth Processes with Competing Mechanisms
Modified Logistic Isothermal Microbial Growth Ratio
Generalized Logistic (Verhulst) Isothermal Microbial Growth
Microbial Population Growth, Mortality, and Transitions between Them
Diauxic Growth of Bacteria on Two Substrates

This article includes material from an article posted on 26 April 2003 on Nupedia; written by Nagina Parmar; reviewed and approved by the Biology group; editor, Gaytha Langlois; lead reviewer, Gaytha Langlois ; lead copyeditors, Ruth Ifcher. and Jan Hogle.

Bacteriology
Population
Mathematics in medicine